William de Ferrers or Guillaume de Ferrières may refer to:
William de Ferrers, 3rd Earl of Derby (d. 1190)
William de Ferrers, 4th Earl of Derby (c. 1198–c. 1247)
William de Ferrers, 5th Earl of Derby (1193–1254)
Guillaume de Ferrières (c. 1150 – ?April 1204), the Vidame de Chartres, a French trouvère

See also
William de Ferrers School, a secondary school in South Woodham Ferrers, Essex